The Dower House is a Grade II* listed house in Cooper's Lane between Potters Bar and Northaw in Hertfordshire, England. It was built in 1749 and was formerly known as Fairlawn House.

References 

Grade II* listed buildings in Hertfordshire
Houses in Hertfordshire
Potters Bar
Residential buildings completed in 1749
Dower houses